John Elliot Page (23 September 1901 – 1979) was an English footballer who played in the Football League for Millwall and Luton Town. He played in either inside-forward position, or as a left-half.

Born in Grays, Essex, Page played for Grays Thurrock United before joining Millwall in April 1926. The move represented the highest transfer fee paid for a Kent League player. He made 16 appearances, scoring three goals, over four seasons with Millwall, before joining Luton Town in 1930. He spent a single season at Luton, making four appearances and scoring one goal. He then moved to Chatham Town.

References

1901 births
1979 deaths
Place of death missing
People from Grays, Essex
Sportspeople from Essex
English footballers
Association football inside forwards
Association football wing halves
Grays Thurrock United F.C. players
Millwall F.C. players
Luton Town F.C. players
Chatham Town F.C. players
English Football League players
Kent Football League (1894–1959) players